The Muddy River Rollers (MRR) is a women's flat track roller derby league based in Moncton, New Brunswick. Founded in 2010, the league consists of two travel teams, which compete against teams from other leagues. Muddy River is a member of the Women's Flat Track Derby Association (WFTDA).

History
The league was founded in May 2010 by Carole Maillet, known as "Burn 'N' Rub'Her", and she was soon joined by Trevor Goodwin, "Jesus Take the Wheels", who became the head coach. It was playing bouts by the following year, when its away bout against the Halifax Roller Derby Association drew in a capacity crowd of eight hundred fans.

In September 2012, Muddy River competed at the Roller Derby Association of Canada's first Atlantic Canada Roller Derby Championship, beating the Fog City Rollers to win the tournament and qualify for the following year's national championship.

Muddy River was accepted as a member of the Women's Flat Track Derby Association Apprentice Program in April 2013, and became a full WFTDA member in October 2014. Muddy River received their first ranking as a WFTDA member with the May 31, 2015 rankings update, debuting at 99 overall.

WFTDA rankings

References

Sport in Moncton
Roller derby leagues established in 2010
Roller derby leagues in Canada
Women's Flat Track Derby Association leagues
2010 establishments in New Brunswick
Women's sports in Canada